Henry Kent Mitchell II (born March 29, 1939) is a retired American rowing coxswain. He competed in the coxed pairs at the 1960 and 1964 Olympics and won a bronze and a gold medal, respectively. He was a law student at the UC Berkeley School of Law at the time. He won a bronze medal in the same event in 1960 while an undergraduate at Stanford University (class of 1961). Only two other Americans have coxed two crews to Olympic medals. He also coxed Stanford to two national championships, in 1961 and 1962.

Following graduation from law school in 1965 he practiced law in Palo Alto, California. He also set up and leads the Kent Mitchell Rowing Club, an elite masters competitive organization composed mostly of former national or Olympic champions. He also served three terms as mayor of Portola Valley, California.

He is in the Stanford University Hall of Fame and the National Rowing Hall of Fame.

References

1939 births
Living people
Coxswains (rowing)
Rowers at the 1960 Summer Olympics
Rowers at the 1964 Summer Olympics
Olympic gold medalists for the United States in rowing
Olympic bronze medalists for the United States in rowing
Stanford Cardinal rowers
UC Berkeley School of Law alumni
Stanford University alumni
Sportspeople from Albany, New York
People from Portola Valley, California
American male rowers
Medalists at the 1964 Summer Olympics
Medalists at the 1960 Summer Olympics
Mayors of places in California